The Wild Horse Wind Farm is a 273-megawatt wind farm that generates energy for Puget Sound Energy that consists of one hundred twenty seven 1.8-megawatt Vestas V80 turbines and twenty two 2.0-megawatt Vestas V80 turbines on a  site in Kittitas County, Washington,  east of Ellensburg, Washington.
The turbines are placed on the high open Shrub-steppe ridge tops of Whiskey Dick Mountain, which was
chosen for its energetic wind resource, remote location, and access to nearby power transmission lines. The site is also home to one of the largest solar array (500 kW) in Washington.

The wind farm was developed by Horizon Wind (formerly owned by Goldman Sachs, later sold to EDP) EDP Renewables, a subsidiary of Energias de Portugal S.A. (EDP), a Portuguese utility company and built by Puget Sound Energy (PSE), an electric and gas distribution utility in the State of Washington. Construction began in October 2005 and was completed in December 2006. An expansion was completed in 2009.

The Wild Horse Wind Farm also has a visitor center called the Renewable Energy Center, with guided tours of a Silicon Energy Solar array, a 1.8 MW wind turbine generator, a wind turbine blade, and includes a look inside the base of a wind turbine.

See also

Wind farm
Wind power in the United States

References

External links

Construction History of Wild Horse Wind Power Project, acpubs.com
Wild Horse Wind Farm, Horizon Wind Energy
Expansion plans, nwsource.com
Wild Horse Wind and Solar Facility, Puget Sound Energy

Buildings and structures in Kittitas County, Washington
Wind farms in Washington (state)
Energy infrastructure completed in 2006
Puget Sound Energy